William Walter Boyd (January 27, 1906 – November 21, 1997) was a professional poker player.

Boyd was a five-card stud player; he won all four of his World Series of Poker bracelets in five-card stud. Boyd, Doyle Brunson and Loren Klein are the only players in WSOP history to have won bracelets in four consecutive years.

Additionally, Boyd is responsible for the spread of Omaha hold 'em.  In 1983, Robert "Chip Burner" Turner approached Boyd, who was then the director of operations at the Golden Nugget casino in Las Vegas, Nevada.  The game, being previously unnamed, was called Nugget hold 'em. Sometime later, it was renamed to its current name of "Omaha".

Boyd managed the card room at the Golden Nugget from the day it opened in 1946 until its closing in 1988.

As a tribute to his long career, he was dealt the first poker hand ever at the Mirage.  He was elected to the Poker Hall of Fame in 1981.

Boyd died in Las Vegas on November 21, 1997, at the age of 91.

World Series of Poker Bracelets

References

External links

Hendon Mob tournament results

1906 births
1997 deaths
American poker players
World Series of Poker bracelet winners
People from Columbia County, Arkansas
People from Las Vegas
Poker Hall of Fame inductees